Rang-du-Fliers is a commune in the Pas-de-Calais department in the Hauts-de-France region of France.

Geography
Rang-du-Fliers is located on the Côte d'Opale (the Opal Coast), 4 miles (6 km) from the beach and 5 miles (8 km) southeast of Montreuil-sur-Mer on the D917 road. Rang-du-Fliers station has rail connections to Calais, Boulogne, Amiens and Paris.

History
Rang-du-Fliers became a commune in 1870, having been previously only a hamlet of Verton. The population of this hamlet lived poorly amid the marshes and fields that had formed over the centuries behind the dunes.
Boatmen, weavers, labourers and a few tenants occupying the cob houses built on land by the edge of the many drainage ditches. 
"Rang" comes from Rin meaning canal or "Tringue" a drainage trench  (this term is still found in Great Tringue, north of the town), and closely related to the English rhyne.
"Fliers" comes from the Flemish Vliet which means "Little River". Hence the name "Rein-Vliet" (Rang-du-Fliers). This etymology has shifted somewhat over time, so we find Reng-du-Fliez in an entry of at the castle of Beaurain dated 1633, "Le Rang Deflier" on a map of 1790 and "Le Rang d'Effliers" on a military map of 1830. 
The future of Rang-du-Fliers turned in the middle of the 19th century with the construction of the railway line from Paris to Calais. In 1848, the mayor of Verton refused the building of a station in the town because of alleged pollution, and it was decided instead to build it at Rang-du-Fliers. 
The railway station rapidly took on an importance, especially when a sugar mill was built in 1858 and the commune enjoyed ever-growing prosperity, employing up to 800 people in the years before 1914 during the beet campaigns. 
Since 1867, the village of Rang-du-Fliers had everything to make a commune: a church (1864), a priest, a cemetery, a station, a school and a factory that encouraged more and more workers to settle there.
The idea of separating from Verton had its way, helped by the lack of interest shown by the Verton council. After two petitions and many heated debates, Rang-du-Fliers was elevated to separate commune status by imperial decree on 17 July 1870.

Population

Places of interest
 The church of St. Eugene, dating from the nineteenth century.

Notable people
 Micheline Ostermeyer, Olympic champion athlete and pianist, was born here.
 Jacques Maximin, chef.

Twin towns
 Ditton, United Kingdom

See also
Communes of the Pas-de-Calais department

References

External links

 Tourist Office of Rang-du-Fliers 

Rangdufliers